Denaro is the Italian word for money, derived from the Arabic dinar, which in turn derived from the Latin denarius. Denaro may also refer to:

 Denaro, Virginia, an unincorporated community in Amelia County
 Arthur Denaro (born 1948), general of the British Army 
 Matteo Messina Denaro (born 1962), a Sicilian Mafia boss
 French denier, medieval coin